Moseley is a former settlement in Butte County, California. It lay at an elevation of 1811 feet (552 m).

References

External links

Former settlements in Butte County, California
Former populated places in California